The 2003 South Gloucestershire Council election took place on 1 May 2003 to elect members of South Gloucestershire unitary authority in England. All 70 seats in the  council were up for election. The Liberal Democrats once again gained a plurality of seats but lost overall control of the council as the Conservatives won the most votes and therefore made large gains at the expense of the Lib Dems and Labour.

Election result

Ward results
In wards that are represented by more than one councillor, electors were given more than one vote each, hence the voter turnout may not match the number of votes cast.

References

2003 English local elections
2003
2000s in the South Gloucestershire District